140 Squadron of the Israeli Air Force, also Golden Eagle Squadron, is an F-35I "Adir" squadron based at Nevatim Airbase in Israel.

Formerly an F-16A/B squadron, the squadron was closed on 2 August 2013, as part of IDF budget cuts, its aircraft allocated to 116 Squadron (Defenders of the South).

In 2015 it was announced that the "Golden Eagle" will be the first Lockheed Martin F-35 Lightning II Squadron in the IAF. The squadron received its first two aircraft on December 12, 2016.

References 

Israeli Air Force squadrons